Mario Cafiero (died 13 September 2020) was an Argentine politician who served as a Deputy.

References

1950s births
2020 deaths
Argentine politicians